Spittelau  is a station on  and  of the Vienna U-Bahn.

The U4 platforms at Spittelau, along with the ÖBB platforms served by regional trains and by line S40 of the Vienna S-Bahn, are at ground level.  Above these platforms, and crossing them at right angles, are the U6 platforms.

The whole interchange station complex is located in the Alsergrund District. The U-Bahn station opened in 1995.

References

Buildings and structures in Alsergrund
Railway stations opened in 1995
Vienna U-Bahn stations
1995 establishments in Austria
Railway stations in Austria opened in the 20th century